These are the official results of the Men's 400 metres event at the 1982 European Championships in Athens, Greece, held at Olympic Stadium "Spiros Louis" on 7, 8, and 9 September 1982.

Medalists

Results

Final
9 September

Semi-finals
8 September

Semi-final 1

Semi-final 2

Heats
7 September

Heat 1

Heat 2

Heat 3

Heat 4

Participation
According to an unofficial count, 26 athletes from 15 countries participated in the event.

 (1)
 (1)
 (1)
 (3)
 (1)
 (1)
 (3)
 (2)
 (1)
 (3)
 (1)
 (1)
 (3)
 (3)
 (1)

See also
 1978 Men's European Championships 400 metres (Prague)
 1980 Men's Olympic 400 metres (Moscow)
 1983 Men's World Championships 400 metres (Helsinki)
 1984 Men's Olympic 400 metres (Los Angeles)
 1986 Men's European Championships 400 metres (Stuttgart)
 1987 Men's World Championships 400 metres (Rome)
 1988 Men's Olympic 400 metres (Seoul)

References

 Results

400 metres
400 metres at the European Athletics Championships